Rules and Referee Committee (RRC) is the group responsible for upholding and interpretation of the Bandy Playing Rules. The committee is a part of the Federation of International Bandy but is working independently.

The committee is headed by a chairman and four vice chairmen, all from different countries. In 2015, Olle Modin (Sweden) was elected new chairman with vice chairmen from Finland, Norway and Russia. One post as vice chairman was left vacant.

References

Bandy
Bandy rules
Federation of International Bandy